Jehangir Kabir was an Indian Bengali politician and Trade Union Leader.

The brother of the Indian educationist, Humayun Kabir, Jehangir Kabir was born in village Komarpur, near Faridpur in what is now Bangladesh.
His father, Kabiruddin Ahmed was a deputy magistrate in the British Raj. His grandfather was awarded the title of Khan Bahadur by the British. After completing his education from Calcutta University, Jehangir Kabir joined the Indian National Congress and started off as a trade union leader. He rose rapidly through the ranks and was made a minister in the post independence governments of Bidhan Chandra Roy, Prafulla Chandra Sen, and Jyoti Basu. He represented Haroa in the West Bengal Legislative Assembly.

His son Justice Altamas Kabir was the 39th Chief Justice of the Supreme Court of India, while a daughter Shukla Kabir Sinha is a retired judge of the Calcutta High Court.

References

Year of birth missing
Year of death missing
Bengali politicians
Indian Muslims
Trade unionists from West Bengal
University of Calcutta alumni
Indian National Congress politicians from West Bengal
Bangladeshi trade unionists
West Bengal MLAs 1957–1962
West Bengal MLAs 1962–1967
Bangla Congress politicians